Şağlaser (also, Şağlasər and Shaglaser) is a village and municipality in the Lankaran Rayon of Azerbaijan.  It has a population of 4,148.

References 

Populated places in Lankaran District